Shinda is the fertility god of the Ainu people. Traditional Ainu recite prayers of thanksgiving to Shinda before every meal.

References

Ainu kamuy
Fertility gods